On Your Every Word is the second studio album released by Amy Holland in 1983. This was her last studio album, before she spent the rest of the 1980s recording songs for film soundtracks such as Scarface, Teen Wolf, Night of the Comet, St. Elmo's Fire, K-9, and much more. In one of the songs on the album, she sings a duet with David Pack on the song "I Still Run to You". There is a cover version of The Four Tops' song "Shake Me, Wake Me (When It's Over)" sung by Holland. Steve Lukather collaborates on the album and does a guitar solo during an instrumental break on the last song of the album, Rollin' By. In addition to the album's release, 1983 was the year when Holland and Michael McDonald got married. Holland did not release another studio album until 2008, when she released The Journey to Miracle River.

Track listing

Personnel
 Amy Holland - lead vocals
 Michael McDonald - acoustic piano (2, 6, 7, 8) Fender Rhodes (3, 5, 9), synthesizers (2,4-6, 8, 9) background vocals (all tracks)
David Pack, lead vocals (8), background vocals (2, 4, 8)
Brian Mann - keyboards (1), synthesizers (2-7), acoustic piano (3, 5, 9) accordion (3), Fender Rhodes (7, 8)
James Newton Howard - synthesizers (3, 8), string arrangements, (3, 8)
Robert Akers Terry - guitar solo (4, 5)
Robben Ford - guitar (1), guitar solo (7)
John McFee - guitar (1, 2, 3, 6, 9)
Steve Lukather - guitar (2-5, 7,8), guitar solo (9)
Mark Leonard - bass guitar (1)
Bob Glaub - bass guitar (2, 6)
Louis Johnson - bass guitar (3)
Nathan East - bass guitar (4, 5, 7, 8)
Willie Weeks - bass guitar (9)
Jeff Porcaro - drums (1, 3, 9)
Mike Baird - drums (2, 4-8)
Chet McCracken - Simmons drums (1), vibraphone (8)
Tom Scott - saxophone solo (1), Lyricon (3), horn arrangements (7, 9), horns (9)
Vince Denham - saxophone solo (8)
Paul Medeiros - handclaps (3)
Maureen McDonald - background vocals (1)
Denny Henson - background vocals (2)
Jeff Day - background vocals (4)
Kathy Walker - background vocals (5, 9)
Richard Page, Steve George (6)
Patrick Simmons, Ed Sanford (7)
Jim Horn, Larry Williams , Chuck Findley, Dick Hyde, Jerry Hey, Ernie Watts - horns

References

1983 albums
Amy Holland albums
Capitol Records albums